Mangur-e Sharqi Rural District is in Khalifan District of Mahabad County, West Azerbaijan province, Iran. At the National Census of 2006, its population was 7,545 in 1,186 households. There were 6,900 inhabitants in 1,403 households at the following census of 2011. At the most recent census of 2016, the population of the rural district was 6,230 in 1,324 households. The largest of its 79 villages was Hamzehabad, with 469 people.

References 

Mahabad County

Rural Districts of West Azerbaijan Province

Populated places in West Azerbaijan Province

Populated places in Mahabad County